Axiocerses bambana is a butterfly in the family Lycaenidae. It is found in the Democratic Republic of the Congo, Tanzania and Zambia. The habitat consists of moist woodland.

Adults have been recorded in November, December and March.

Subspecies
Axiocerses bambana bambana (Tanzania)
Axiocerses bambana orichalcea Henning & Henning, 1996 (south-eastern Democratic Republic of the Congo, central Zambia)

References

Butterflies described in 1900
Axiocerses
Butterflies of Africa
Taxa named by Henley Grose-Smith